The International Country Cuneo was a tournament for professional female tennis players played on outdoor clay courts. The event was classified as a $15,000 ITF Women's Circuit tournament. It was held annually in Cuneo, Italy from 1999 to 2018. The tournament, previously a $100,000 event, was not held from 2012 to 2016, and was revived in 2017 as a $15,000 tournament.

Past finals

Singles

Doubles

External links
 Official website 
 ITF search 

ITF Women's World Tennis Tour
Clay court tennis tournaments
Tennis tournaments in Italy
Recurring sporting events established in 1999
1999 establishments in Italy
Recurring sporting events disestablished in 2018
Defunct tennis tournaments in Italy